Moel Gyw is a hill in Denbighshire, North Wales and forms part of the Clwydian Range. It is situated just to the south of Moel Famau and Foel Fenlli.

External links
 www.geograph.co.uk : photos of Moel Gyw and surrounding area

Marilyns of Wales
Mountains and hills of Denbighshire